Tamás Nagy (born 30 July 1987) is a Hungarian football (forward) player who currently plays for Balassagyarmati VSE.

References 
 HLSZ 
 

1987 births
Living people
Hungarian footballers
Association football midfielders
Vác FC players
Vasas SC players
Lombard-Pápa TFC footballers
Diósgyőri VTK players
Kaposvölgye VSC footballers
Rákospalotai EAC footballers
BFC Siófok players
Budaörsi SC footballers
Budafoki LC footballers
III. Kerületi TUE footballers
Ceglédi VSE footballers
Nemzeti Bajnokság I players
Nemzeti Bajnokság II players
Hungarian expatriate footballers
Expatriate footballers in Austria
Expatriate soccer players in Australia
Hungarian expatriate sportspeople in Austria
Hungarian expatriate sportspeople in Australia
Footballers from Budapest